Lynn Classical High School is a high school in the city of Lynn, Massachusetts, United States. It is a part of Lynn Public Schools.

The school was once located off of the Lynn Commons, in a building which is now the Fecteau-Leary school. The high school was moved to O'Callaghan Way after the controversial construction of a new facility. The new facility, built on landfill, required significant repair after the building's foundation began to sink due a lack of steel pilings.

Classical has maintained a fairly strong record in terms of graduation rates and test scores. The school has been lauded in the past by publications such as U.S. News & World Report.

The school also has a strong athletic tradition, and is the school from which Harry Agganis graduated before becoming a world class athlete. In the school's main foyer, a mural of Agganis greets visitors.

Notable alumni

 Harry A. Dame, quarterback, high school football coach 

 Harry Agganis, Major League Baseball first baseman
 Julie Archoska, National Football League player
 Edward Farnsworth, All-American college football player
 Ken Hill, Major League Baseball pitcher
 Glenn Ordway, sports commentator
 Lou Tsioropoulos, professional basketball player
 Gasper Urban, football player
 Beverly Hilton, poet, 1943

References

External links
 http://www.lynnschools.org/ourschools_classical.shtml

Public high schools in Massachusetts
Schools in Lynn, Massachusetts
Northeastern Conference